Piet Wijnberg (20 October 1957 – October 2021) was a Dutch professional footballer who played as a central defender for SC 't Gooi, Utrecht, Ajax, Go Ahead Eagles, NEC, DS'79, Sparta and FC Hilversum. He also represented the Netherlands at under-21 and Olympic levels.

References

External links
Profile at Ererat.nl 

1957 births
2021 deaths
Sportspeople from Hilversum
Dutch footballers
Association football defenders
Netherlands under-21 international footballers
SC 't Gooi players
FC Utrecht players
AFC Ajax players
Go Ahead Eagles players
NEC Nijmegen players
FC Dordrecht players
Sparta Rotterdam players
FC Hilversum players
Eredivisie players
Eerste Divisie players
Footballers from North Holland